Doina Ruști ((born 15 February 1957) is a Romanian writer and novelist. Some of her novels are:  (The Ghost in the Mill), 2008, 2006, and Lizoanca la 11 ani (Lizoanca at age eleven), 2009.

Biography
Ruști was born in Comoșteni, Dolj County. She was brought up in a village in the south of Romania by her parents and teachers, struggling to survive in a communist world. Her blood accommodates ancestry ranging from Montenegrin to Jews and especially Danubian Romanians, all with long names ending in -escu, most of them teachers, store keepers and horse dealers. Her childhood home in Comoșteni preserved the experiences of a Balkan world, collected throughout hundreds of years.

Ruști's youth was spent in a house which had saved the traces of a past rich in events, carriages, coffers and period clothes, crowned by plenty of books and objects which incited her imagination. But this world had brutally come to an end. When she was eleven, her father was murdered under mysterious circumstances, which have not been elucidated even to this day. The insecurity, oppression, absurd rules and chaos installed at the end of communism blended with the fantastic universe of a village governed by ghost tales, hierophanies, and underground forces, and this dramatic and magical setting inspired the novel Fantoma din moară (The Ghost in the Mill). For this novel, she was awarded the Prize of the Writers' Union of Romania.

Work
A representative contemporary writer, Ruști has a wide variety of topics covered in her novels with a systematic construction. Some of her books were translated into international languages.

Her novel Lizoanca la 11 ani, 2009, 2017 was awarded the Ion Creangă Prize of the Romanian Academy. It was remarked as "one of the most powerful contemporary Romanian novels", from the point of view of its themes and typology construction (according to Paul Cernat, Gelu Ionescu On its publication, Lizoanca caused debates, as it brought to the public's attention the story of a child almost unanimously accused of the atrocities committed by the accusers. Translated into German, Spanish, Italian, Hungarian, the novel had reviews and kindled debates on taboo themes, such as pedophilia, domestic abuse, the issue of children with incompetent parents (Marina Freier and Magyar Nemzet). For that matter, the topic of family decay as an institution is recurrent in all the novels written by Doina Ruști.

Her bestseller   (The Phanariot Manuscript), 2015, 2016, 2017), which novelizes a18th-century's love story, was followed by Mâța Vinerii (The Book of Perilous Dishes, 2017), a tale about sorcerers and magical culinary recipes, translated into German, Spanish and Hungarian. These two books give a perspective on a quite controversial historical period: the 18th Phanariot century. The stodgy style, the poetic overlay and the narrative fluidity were hallmarks of these two books. She is also the author of the novel Omulețul roșu (The Little Red Man, 2004, 2012), which was awarded the Prize of the magazine Convorbiri Literare, and the multi-awarded Zogru (2006, 2015), a meta-novel translated into Italian, Bulgarian, Hungarian, and Spanish.

Ruști brings a specific vision into literature, exhibited throughout all strata of her work, but especially from a linguistic point of view. The creativity of expression lends the marker of her writing.

She also wrote a number of short stories, published in periodicals and anthologies.

Style
Taking an interest in both the fantastic and realist genres, Doina Ruști succeeds in writing as persuasively about the atrocities of the contemporary world and high ideals. Her novels often feature rapists, murderers, people who are starving, become corrupt or consumed by trivial commitments, reminding us of William Faulkner's characters – writer who has always inspired her. Ruști also brings to life fantastic characters, elves, sprites, ghosts, magical cats and sorcerers, which prompted some critics to compare her work with Marc Chagall, with Mikhail Bulgakov's, Süskind's and Márquez's[15] (according to Dan C. Mihăilescu, Marco Dotti and Neue Zürcher Zeitung). The diversified themes that are strongly related to the present, as well as the ability of Doina Rusti of switching between registers, place her among the writers of contemporary Romanian literature (according to Breban, Norman Manea, Daniel Cristea-Enache).

Novels
  (Occult Beds), Litera, 2020
 Homeric, Polirom, 2019
 Logodnica (The Fiancée), Polirom, 2017
  (The Book of Perilous Dishes), Polirom, 2017
 , Polirom, Top 10+, 2017
 , (The Phanariot Manuscript) Polirom, 2015, 2016
 , 2nd ed, Polirom, Top 10+, 2013
 Mămica la două albăstrele (The Story of an Adulterer), Polirom, 2013
 Patru bărbați plus Aurelius (Four Men Plus Aurelius), Polirom, 2011
 Cămașa în carouri și alte 10 întâmplări din București (The Checkered Shirt and 10 other episodes from Bucharest), a narrative puzzle, Polirom, 2010
 Lizoanca la 11 ani (Lizoanca at the Age of Eleven), Ed. Trei, 2009
 Fantoma din moară (The Ghost in the Mill), Polirom, 2008.
 Zogru, Polirom, Iași, 2006, 2nd ed, 2013
 Omulețul roșu (The Little Red Man), Ed. Vremea, Bucharest, 2004

Translated work
  La gata del viernes (trad Enrique Nogueras, Esdrújula Ediciones, Granada, 2019 
Das Phantom in der Mühle (trad. Eva Ruth Wemme), Klak Verlag, Berlin, 2017
Lizoanca (trad. Szenkovics Enikő), Orpheusz, Budapest, 2015
 Eliza a los once años (trans. Enrique Nogueras), Ediciones Traspiés, Granada, 2014
 Zogru (trad. Szenkovics Enikő), Sétatér Kulturális Egyesüle, 2014
 Lisoanca, Rediviva Ed., Milano, 2013
 L'omino rosso, Nikita Editore, Firenze, 2012
 Bill Cinton's Hand, in Bucharest Tales, New Europe Writers, 2011 (coord: A. Fincham, J. G Coon, John a'Beckett)
 I miei ginecologi, in Compagne di viaggio, Sandro Teti Editore, 2011 (coord Radu Pavel Gheo, Dan Lungu)
 Zogru (transl. Roberto Merlo), Ed. Bonanno, Roma, 2010
 L'omino rosso (transl. Roberto Merlo) in Il romanzo romeno contemporaneo (coord Nicoleta Nesu) Ed. Bagatto Libri, Rome, 2010
 Cristian – Nagyvilag (transl. Noémi László), Budapesta, Sept. 2010
 The Winner – Nagyvilag (transl. Noémi László), Budapesta, Sept. 2010 etc.
 Cristian (trans. in fr. Linda Maria Baros), rev Le Bateau Fantôme, no. 8, 2009, Ed. Mathieu Hilfiger
 Zogru (transl. Vasilka Alexova), Ed. Balkani, 2008
 Dicționar de simboluri din opera lui Mircea Eliade (frag.) în La Jornada Semanal, nr. 455, 456, Mexico City, 2003 (trans: José Antonio Hernández García)
 Lizoanca (trans Jan Cornelius), Horlemann Verlag, Berlin

Literary prizes
  The Romanian Academy's Ion Creangă Prize for the novel "Lizoanca at the Age of Eleven", 2009
 The Prize of the Writers Union of Romania for the novel "The Ghost in the Mill", 2008
 The Golden Medal of Schitul Darvari, for literary activity. 2008
 The Prize of the Bucharest Writers Association for the novel "Zogru", 2007

Bibliography 
 Pedro Gandolfo –  Un espiritu ligeramente inqueto, El Mercurio, 19 August 2018
 Adina Mocanu – La infancia en femenino las niñas, Icaria Editorial, Barcelona, 2016, p. 2017.
 Ramón Acín – Turia, 115, Instituto de Estudio Turolenses, 2015, p. 323
 Jeffrey Andrew Weinstock, The Ashgate Encyclopedia of Literary Cinematic Monsters, Routledge, New York, 2015
 Antonio J. Ubero – Las fabricas del odio, La Opinión, 3 01, 2015
 Emanuela Illie – Fantastic și alteritate, Junimea, 2013, p. 92 și urm.
 Roberto Merlo – Quaderni di studi italieni e romeni, 5, 2010, Edizioni dell'Orso, p. 121
 Daniel Cristea Enache – Timpuri noi, Ed. Cartea Românească, 2009, pp 172; 174
 Dan C. Mihăilescu – Literatura română în postceaușism, II. Prezentul ca dezumanizare, Ed. Polirom, 2006, p. 248

Notes

References

External links

 Official site Doina Ruşti
You Tube Doina Ruști channel
Amazon
LITERA
 Radio Romania International – Romanian Writer Doina Rusti
 Doina Ruști pe Internet Movie Database
Contemporary Romanian Writers & Fiction Makers
 Observator Cultural: Ficțiune și magie în decorul Bucureștiului fanariot

Evenments 

 Frankfurter Bukmesse
 Das Phantom

1957 births
Living people
Romanian women novelists
Romanian women short story writers
Romanian short story writers
People from Dolj County
21st-century Romanian novelists
21st-century Romanian women writers
Slavery in the Ottoman Empire
Romanian novelists